Catalan Solidarity (SC) was a coalition of political parties in Catalonia formed after the 1905 ¡Cu-Cut! incident and the approval of the 1906 Jurisdiction Act.

Defunct political party alliances in Spain
Political parties in Catalonia
Political parties established in 1906
Political parties disestablished in 1909
1906 establishments in Spain
1909 disestablishments in Spain
Restoration (Spain)